This is a filmography of the Powell-Cotton family, including films by Percy Powell-Cotton and Diana and Antoinette Powell-Cotton.

1920–1929

N. Nigeria, Major P.H.G Powell-Cotton, (1924–1925)
French Congo, Major P.H.G. Powell-Cotton, (1926–1927)
Gorilla Drive, Cameroons, Major P.H.G Powell-Cotton, (1929)

1930–1939

Crafts in the Cameroons (or Cameroon Crafts), Major P.H.G. Powell-Cotton, (1931)
Cameroons, Major P.H.G. Powell-Cotton, (1931)
Osonigbe Juju House & Benin Brass Casting, Major P.H.G. Powell-Cotton, (1931)
Some tribes of the Southern Sudan, Major P.H.G. Powell-Cotton, (1933)
Sudan 1933 Lango people only, Major P.H.G. Powell-Cotton, (1933)
Somaliland: Pot Making, Dr. D. Powell-Cotton, (1934)
Italian Somaliland: Cattle Tending, Butter Making etc, Dr. D. Powell-Cotton, (1934)
Somaliland: bread making, pillow making, bow-string making, Major P.H.G. Powell-Cotton and Dr. D. Powell-Cotton (1934–35)
Somaliland: Beard plucking, Koran School, Major P.H.G. Powell-Cotton and Dr. D. Powell-Cotton, (1934–35)
Italian Somaliland: Making a (winnowing) basket, Major P.H.G. Powell-Cotton and Dr. D. Powell-Cotton, (1934–35)
Somaliland: Mat making, Major P.H.G. Powell-Cotton and Dr. D. Powell-Cotton, (1934)
Somaliland: Skinning, Major P.H.G. Powell-Cotton and Dr. D. Powell-Cotton, (1934)
Morocco: Pot making, Major P.H.G. Powell-Cotton & Mrs H.B. Powell-Cotton, (1936)
Angola: Dombondola Potter, Dr. D. Powell-Cotton and Miss A. Powell-Cotton, (1936)
Angola: Scenes from a household (Dombondola), Dr. D. Powell-Cotton and Miss A. Powell-Cotton, (1936)
Angola: Chokwe potter (or Angolan Potter), Dr. D. Powell-Cotton and Miss A. Powell-Cotton, (1936)
Angola: N’ganguela bark cloth making, Dr. D. Powell-Cotton and Miss A. Powell-Cotton, (1937)
Angola: Kwanyama day & fishing, Dr. D. Powell-Cotton and Miss A. Powell-Cotton, (1936-7)
Angola: Kwanyama skinning & dressing skins, Dr. D. Powell-Cotton and Miss A. Powell-Cotton, (1936–37)
Angola: Kwanyama Mining & Smelting, Dr. D. Powell-Cotton and Miss A. Powell-Cotton, (1936–37)
Angola: Kwanyama potter’s methods in building pots, Dr. D. Powell-Cotton and Miss A. Powell-Cotton, (1936–37)
Angola: Kwanyama Efendula, Dr. D. Powell-Cotton and Miss A. Powell-Cotton (1937)
Angola: Kwanyama Medicine woman initiation, Dr. D. Powell-Cotton and Miss A. Powell-Cotton, (1937)
SW Africa & Angola, Major P.H.G. Powell Cotton & Mr C Powell Cotton (1937)
Tanganyika: Serengeti Park, Major & Mrs. P.H.G. Powell-Cotton (1938–39)
‘'Tanganyika: Two Potters and making beer strainers, Major & Mrs. P.H.G. Powell-Cotton (1938–39)

1950–1959British East Africa, Dr. D. Powell Cotton (1950)British East Africa, Dr. D. Powell Cotton (1951)Serengeti, British East Africa, Dr. D. Powell Cotton (1951)British East Africa, Dr. D. Powell Cotton (1952)South Africa: Kruger National Park, Mr C. Powell-Cotton & Dr. D. Powell-Cotton (1950s)South Africa: The Victoria Falls, Mr C. Powell-Cotton & Dr. D. Powell-Cotton (1950s)South Africa: Victoria Falls & Livingstone Game Park, Mr C. Powell-Cotton & Dr. D. Powell-Cotton (1950s)Uganda: Scenes in Uganda, Mr C. Powell-Cotton & Dr. D. Powell-Cotton (1950s)Uganda: Lake Edward Game Reserve, Mr C. Powell-Cotton & Dr. D. Powell-Cotton (1950s)Uganda: The Murchinson Falls Park, Mr C. Powell-Cotton & Dr. D. Powell-Cotton (1950-54)Tanzania: Serengeti National Park, Mr C. Powell-Cotton & Dr. D. Powell-Cotton (1950 – 52)West Uganda: Q.E, National Park, Mr C. Powell-Cotton (1952-53)West Uganda: Queen Elizabeth National Park, Western Uganda, Mr C. Powell-Cotton & Dr. D. Powell-Cotton (1952-53)Animals of East Africa, Mr.C.Powell-Cotton and Dr.D.Powell-Cotton (1952—53)Uganda: Some events in Lango District, Mr C Powell-Cotton (1954)West Uganda: Murchinson Falls National Park, Mr C Powell-Cotton & Dr D Powell-Cotton (1954)West Uganda: Game on the Headwaters of the Nile, Mr C Powell-Cotton & Dr D Powell-Cotton (1954)West Uganda: Murchison Falls (National Park), Mr C Powell-Cotton & Dr. D. Powell-Cotton (1954)
Uganda: Kumam people, Dr. D. Powell-Cotton (1954)
Northern Province, Uganda: Country Shows, Mr. C. Powell-Cotton (1954)
Uganda: Scenes from the Northern Province, Mr C. Powell-Cotton (1955)
Uganda: Some Scenes in Lango District, Mr C. Powell-Cotton (1956)
Some dances of Northern Uganda, Dr. D. Powell-Cotton and Mr. C. Powell-Cotton. (1958)

1960–1969

Uganda: A Journey through Uganda, Mr C. Powell-Cotton (1962–63)
Kenya: Wildlife in Kenya, Mr C..Powell-Cotton and Dr. D. Powell-Cotton (1963)
Kenya: Wildlife in Kenya Dr. D. Powell-Cotton (1965)
Kenya: Tsavo National Park, Dr.D.Powell-Cotton and Mr C. Powell-Cotton (1965)
Uganda: Two National Parks of Uganda, Mr C. Powell-Cotton and Dr. D. Powell-Cotton (1965)
Some Animals of Northern Tanganyika, Dr. D. Powell-Cotton (1965)
Uganda/Tanzania: Animals of Kenya & Tanzania, Dr. D. Powell-Cotton (1967)

1970–1979

Kenya: Pelican Dr. D. Powell-Cotton (1970)
Kenya: Flamingo Dr. D. Powell-Cotton (1970)
Kenya: Birds of the Rift Valley, Dr. D. Powell-Cotton (1971)
Kenya: Birds of the Rift Valley lakes and shores, Dr. .D. Powell-Cotton (1972—75)
Kenya: animals and Birds of Kenya, Dr. D. Powell-Cotton (1973)

Filmographies